Qarah Kileh (also Romanized as Qarah Kīleh and Qareh Kīleh) is a village in Jafarbay-ye Gharbi Rural District, Gomishan District, Torkaman County, Golestan Province, Iran. During the 2006 census, the population was recorded as 851, all in 147 families.

References 

Populated places in Torkaman County